"Before My Heart Finds Out" is a 1978 single and hit song by Gene Cotton. It was the debut single from his eighth album, Save the Dancer.

The song became his greatest hit, reaching number 23 on the US Billboard Hot 100 and spending three weeks at number 17 in Canada. It also reached number 16 on the US Cash Box Top 100.

"Before My Heart Finds Out" was a much bigger hit on the Adult Contemporary charts, peaking at number 3 in the US and number 4 in Canada.  On the US AC chart, it spent six weeks at number three, in addition to four weeks at number four.

Nine months later, the B-side, "Like a Sunday in Salem (The Amos & Andy Song)", was released as an A-side single, and became a US hit, reaching number 40.

Chart performance

Weekly charts

Year-end charts

References

External links
 Lyrics of this song
 

1978 songs
1978 singles
Songs written by Randy Goodrum
Pop ballads
1970s ballads
Ariola Records singles
Gene Cotton songs